Trictenotoma childreni, the log-boring beetle or brown steampunk beetle, is a species of beetle in the Trictenotomidae family. Basic color of these large beetles is black, the body is slightly flattened. The elytra and the body are covered with thick grayish-yellow hair that fluoresce under ultraviolet light. This species can be found in Malaysia, Myanmar, Borneo, Thailand, Indonesia, Vietnam, China, and India in damp and seasonal forests.

References

External links
 Biolib
 Joel Hallan's Biology Catalog — Texas A&M Univ.
 Trictenotomid beetles (Trictenotomidae)

Tenebrionoidea